Events from the year 1937 in Romania. The year saw the installation of the anti-semitic government of Octavian Goga.

Incumbents
 King: Carol II. 
 Prime Minister: 
 Gheorghe Tătărescu (until 29 December).
 Octavian Goga (after 29 December).

Events

 13 February –  The funerals of Ion Moța and Vasile Marin take place in Bucharest.
 11 March – Nicolae Bălan's report to the Romanian Orthodox Church leads to Freemasonry in Romania dissolving itself.
 20 March – The government affirms its obligations to the League of Nations and Little Entente in preference to closer ties to Nazi Germany.
 26 June – Carol II begins a four day visit to Poland cementing the Polish–Romanian alliance.
 7 December –Frederick, Prince of Hohenzollern and cousin to the king, states to the German ambassador Wilhelm Fabricius that Romania sees no alliance between France and the Little Entente.
 20 December – A general election is held for the Chamber of Deputies. The National Liberal Party remains the largest party in government but the King requests Octavian Goga to form a government.
 29 December –  Goga forms a new government which pursues anti-semitic policies, issuing in the first short-lived period of fascism in the kingdom.
 30 December – The final round of the Senate election is held, the last elections before women's suffrage is introduced.

Births
 19 March – Eduard Prugovečki, physicist and mathematician (died 2003).
 10 May – Tamara Hareven, social historian (died 2002).
 23 May – Irina Odagescu, composer.
 22 September – Nicolae Popescu, mathematician (died 2010).
 16 November – Maria Diaconescu, javelin thrower.

Deaths
 7 May – George Topîrceanu, war poet and satirist (born 1886).
 12 August – Alexandru Stănescu (pen name Alexandru Sahia), journalist and short story writer (born 1908).
 17 December – Dimitrie Călugăreanu, naturalist, physiologist and physician (born 1868).

References

Years of the 20th century in Romania
1930s in Romania
 
Romania
Romania